The Girl on the Barge is a 1929 American drama film directed by Edward Sloman and starring Jean Hersholt and Sally O'Neil. Released during the transition to talkies, the Universal Pictures production was essentially a silent film with some talking sequences. It was filmed in Whitehall NY, the town is looking for a copy of the movie as well

Cast
Jean Hersholt as McCadden
Sally O'Neil as Erie McCadden
Malcolm McGregor as Fogarty
Morris Mackintosh as Huron McCadden (as Morris McIntosh)
Nancy Kelly as Superior McCadden
George Offerman Sr. as Ontario McCadden (as George Offerman)
Henry West as Tug Captain
J. Francis Robertson as Engineer

Production
Although set on the Erie Canal, The Girl on the Barge was filmed on the Champlain Canal in upper New York with the film crew set up in Glens Falls as the Erie Canal looked too modern and commercialized for the story.

References

External links

1929 films
1920s English-language films
American black-and-white films
Universal Pictures films
Films directed by Edward Sloman
1929 drama films
1920s American films